In mathematics, Ostrowski numeration, named after Alexander Ostrowski, is either of two related numeration systems based on continued fractions: a non-standard positional numeral system for integers and a non-integer representation of real numbers.

Fix a positive irrational number α with continued fraction expansion [a0; a1, a2, ...].  Let (qn) be the sequence of denominators of the convergents pn/qn to α: so qn = anqn−1 + qn−2.  Let αn denote Tn(α) where T is the Gauss map T(x) = {1/x}, and write βn = (−1)n+1 α0 α1 ... αn: we have βn = anβn−1 + βn−2.

Real number representations
Every positive real x can be written as

where the integer coefficients 0 ≤ bn ≤ an and if bn = an then bn−1 = 0.

Integer representations
Every positive integer N can be written uniquely as

where the integer coefficients 0 ≤ bn ≤ an and if bn = an then bn−1 = 0.

If α is the golden ratio, then all the partial quotients an are equal to 1, the denominators qn are the Fibonacci numbers and we recover Zeckendorf's theorem on the Fibonacci representation of positive integers as a sum of distinct non-consecutive Fibonacci numbers.

See also
 Complete sequence

References
.
 
 
 

Non-standard positional numeral systems